Legune Station is a pastoral lease that operates as a cattle station in the Northern Territory of Australia.

It is capable of carrying 32,000 head of cattle.

In 2014 the property had been placed on the market for an estimated 60 million; it had been last listed in 2008 with a 70 million price tag.

Legune was originally an outstation of the Victoria River Downs Station.

The property was acquired by Leslie Joseph Hooker at some time prior to 1980. Hooker sold the property to the Malaysian Sabah state government in the early 1980s for 2 million.

In 2014 Legune was owned by the same families behind Sunny Queen Farms who wanted to sell to focus on their pig and poultry interests. The chairman of the board, Brian McLean, said the property had enormous development potential particularly in the area of aquaculture as it backed onto the Ord Irrigation project and had its own  dam on site.

See also
List of ranches and stations

References

Pastoral leases in the Northern Territory
Stations (Australian agriculture)